Corythea may refer to:
 Acalypha (syn. Corythea), a genus of flowering plants in the family Euphorbiaceae
 Thera (moth) (syn. Corythea), a genus of moth of the family Geometridae